Ataegina was a goddess worshipped by the ancient Iberians, Lusitanians, and Celtiberians of the Iberian Peninsula. She is believed to have ruled the underworld.

Names
The deity's name is variously attested as Ataegina, Ataecina, Adaecina and Adaegina, among other spellings. Her name appears in conjunction to a place named Turibriga or Turobriga (see below).

Etymology

Celtic hypothesis

The name Ataegina is most commonly derived from a Celtic source: according to Cristina Maria Grilo Lopes and Juan Olivares Pedreño, French scholar D'Arbois de Jubainville and Portuguese scholar José Leite de Vasconcelos interpreted her name as a compound atae 'repetition' and gina, from *-genos '(to be) born'. Thus, her name would mean 'The Reborn One' ("renascida", in the original).

Others propose a connection to the domain of nocturnal or underworld deities:  tentatively saw a connection with Irish adaig 'night', which may indicate a relation to the underworld. Similarly, in a 1998 article, Eugenio Luján, based on the epigraphic evidence available until then, supposed that Adaecina is the original spelling of her name, and related it to Irish adaig, and both deriving from a Proto-Celtic *adakī. This form would account for both words, but Luján refrained from offering a definitive etymology.

Italian linguist Patrizia de Bernardo Stempel argues for a Celtic etymology, from *atakī ('night'), from an earlier *at-ak-ī ('interval'). Thus, de Bernardo proposes, her name means "the one of the night". In a later article, she describes Ataecina as "the goddess of the nighttime", and derives her name from *Atakī-nā 'the divine (night)time'.

Other hypotheses
That said, her presence in decidedly non-Indo-European Iberian regions suggest that she may have an older, indigenous origin, in which case her name's etymology is more likely Iberian or Tartessian.

In his late 19th century study, José Leite de Vasconcelos, while proposing a Celtic reading of her name, also supposed her origins as a Celticized indigenous deity. Spanish historian  supported the idea of Ataegina's indigenous character, while remarking that a Celtic interpretation of her name as 'reborn' is "inviable", and that her connection to Irish 'night' is "difficult".

Centers of worship
Ataegina was worshipped in Lusitania and Betica; there were also sanctuaries dedicated to Ataegina in  Elvas (Portugal), and Mérida and Cáceres in Spain, along with other places, especially near the Guadiana river. She was one of the goddesses worshipped in Myrtilis (today's Mértola, Portugal), Pax Julia (Beja, Portugal). A bronze plaque from Malpartida de Cáceres suggests associations with the goat as a sacred animal.

Turibriga or Turobriga
Her name appears with adjective Turobrigensis, which seems to indicate a place called Turibriga or Turobriga. Similar epigraphic attestations read Turibrige, [T]urubricae and Turibri, which led professor Amílcar Guerra to indicate a form *Turibris.

This place is interpreted by scholarship to mean the main center of her cult, but its precise location is unknown. Classical author Pliny indicated it belonged to Celtic Beturia.

Functions
Epigraphs from the Badajoz region associate the goddess with the Roman Proserpina (analogous to Greek Persephone), which would make her a goddess presiding over spring and seasonality, echoing the "reborn" derivation of the name, or connect her to the Underworld. In that regard, a dedication etched in marble was found in Augusta Emérita: the propitiator prays to Dea Ataecina Turibrig(ensis) Proserpina for her to avenge the theft of some pieces of clothing.

See also
 Ataecina (dwarf planet)

Footnotes

References

Bibliography

 Frías, Manuel Salinas de; Cortés, Juana Rodríguez. "Corrientes religiosas y vías de comunicación en Lusitania durante el Imperio Romano". In: V Mesa Redonda Internacional sobre Lusitania Romana: las comunicaciones. Cáceres, Facultad de Filosofía y Letras, 7, 8 y 9 de noviembre de 2002. Madrid: Ministerio de Cultura, Secretaría General Técnica, Subdirección General de Información y Publicaciones, 2004. pp. 286–292.
 .
 .
 .
 Olivares Pedreño, Juan Carlos. Los dioses de la hispania céltica. Universitat d´Alacant / Universidad de Alicante, Servicio de Publicaciones: Real Academia de la Historia. 2002. pp. 247–249. .
 Vasconcellos, José Leite de. Religiões da Lusitania na parte que principalmente se refere a Portugal. Lisboa: Imprensa nacional, 1897. pp. 146–173.

Further reading

 Abascal Palazón, Juan Manuel. "Ataecina". In: Luís Raposo (coord.). Religiões da Lusitania. Loquuntur saxa. Lisboa, Museu Nacional de Arqueologia: Ministério da Cultura, Instituto Português de Museus, 2002. pp. 53–60.
 .
 .
 Hernando, Domingo Portela. "El culto a Ataecina en la Península Ibérica". In: Homenaje de Talavera y sus tierras a Don Fernando Jiménez de Gregorio: Talavera, 1998. Coord. por César Pacheco Jiménez, 1998, pp. 121–130. .
 Jordan, Michael. Encyclopedia of Gods, Kyle Cathie Limited, 2002.
 .
 .

Epigraphy
Abascal Palazón, Juan Manuel. “La dea domina sancta Turibrigensis Ataecina y las nuevas evidencias epigráficas de Alcuéscar (Cáceres)”. En: Cardim Ribeiro, José (ed.). Diis · Deabusque. Actas do II Colóquio Internacional de Epigrafia «Culto e Sociedade». (Sintria III-IV, 1995-2007). Sintra: Museu Arqueológico de São Miguel de Odrinhas, 2011, pp. 15–36. .
 .
 González-Conde Puente, María Pilar (2010 [1988]). «Bassus Turobrigensis Y La inscripción De Ataecina En Caleruela (Toledo)». In: Studia Historica: Historia Antigua 6 (febrero): pp. 131–132. https://revistas.usal.es/index.php/0213-2052/article/view/6231.
 .
 .

On the location of Turibriga
 .
 .

Life-death-rebirth goddesses
Spring (season)
Lusitanian goddesses
Basque goddesses
Haumea (dwarf planet)
Celtic goddesses